1948–49 Cairo League, the 27th Cairo League competition, champion was decided by results of Cairo teams in national league with no separate matches for Cairo league competition, Farouk Club (Zamalek SC now) won the competition for 12th time.

League table

Matches

See also
 1948–49 Egyptian Premier League

References

External links
 http://www.angelfire.com/ak/EgyptianSports/CairoZone194849.html

1948–49 in Egyptian football
Cairo League
1948–49 in African association football leagues